Nysäter, or Värmlands Nysäter, is a village in Värmland County, Sweden, located north of the city of Säffle. It belongs to Gillberga Parish.

The first inhabitants came to the place now called Nysäter 2000–1500 years ago. The sand ridge is a place where you can see traces of the prehistoric age and also Kungshöjden and the market-shop. Kungshöjden is a burial mound from 400 to 500 years ago. The market-shop is from 1750.

In Nysäter you can find the small grocery store, ICA Vikinghallen and a Viking Center. Every year in August, there's a fair held in Nysäter, which brings many people to the small village.

In 2010, Nysäter had 149 inhabitants. Despite that, there are both a school and a preschool there.

History 
In 1678 Nysäter village was burned down to the ground, and it was a big catastrophe for the inhabits in Nysäter, since they lost everything they had. The people in the village were in church when the fire began. When they came home the whole village had been destroyed by the fire. The inhabits in Nysäter began to build up the village again after the fire. But it is not known if they built up the village on the same place it was before the fire.

In 1700 the village consisted of seven farms. After that, it began to expand and more farms had begun to be built or bought as the market in Nysäter expanded. Nysäters Cottage was built in the middle of the 1800s. The quire, who owned the whole village, came to live there. This was the start of a new era of growth and modernization. Not long after, a dairy and tannery was built, as well as a bank office was constructed. Sea transports were modernized due to the industrialization and had ships embarked and disembarked on a regular basis.

Gillberga was an independent county in Värmland from 1862 to 1970. Every inhabitant in Gillberga parish was invited to the first county meeting, but only landowners and people who had enough income had right to vote. Over the years changes were made, and finally all inhabitants of age had the right to vote.

Geography 
Gilberga parish is situated in an area that the geologists called Gillberga Skålen, because it has the shape of a bowl. There is a variety of rocks in the area. Grey-stone, granite and red gneiss are some of the rocks that can be found. The parish consisted long ago of high mountains and valleys, and it still does even though they are not that characteristic. The ground in the area has mainly been hardened due to processes in Prehistoric Times.

The farmland consists mostly of clayey soils because for many thousand years the ocean covered what now is Gilberga parish. The Ice Age affected the area, the ground was elevated from the ocean level and clay was left in this place as the ocean withdrew. An interesting finding from the Ice age are the big sand hill in Nysäter and Hasslerud. By the shore of the Gillberga lake, the water has been swirled the sand and done so that the rocks are round cut.

Gilberga lake 
Gillberga lake is a 200-hectare nature reserve. 1986 was the year as it became a nature reserve, a reason for that was the cultural and historical value and it is uniqueness in the county of Värmland. The reserve is located south of Gilberga church. In March and the beginning of April  are the bird skylark there. Later the will be many other birds there.

References 

Populated places in Värmland County